Beals Wright defeated the defending champion Holcombe Ward in the Challenge Round, 6–2, 6–1, 11–9 to win the men's singles tennis title at the 1905 U.S. National Championships. Wright had defeated Clarence Hobart in the All Comers' Final.

The event was held at the Newport Casino in Newport, R.I., USA.

Draw

Challenge round

All Comers' finals

Earlier rounds

Section 1

Section 2

Section 3

Section 4

Section 5

Section 6

Section 7

Section 8

References
 

Men's Singles
1905